GTE may refer to:
 GTE, a defunct American telephone company
 Global Telecoms Exploitation, a British surveillance programme
 Gran Tierra Energy, a Canadian energy company
 Groote Eylandt Airport, in Northern Territory, Australia
 GTE Financial, an American credit union
 LM GTE, a racing car class
 Gone To Earth, the original name of rock band BulletProof Messenger
 Greatest Talent Ever in Indian Idol 12